Gao Min (born September 28, 1970, in Zigong, Sichuan) is a female Chinese diver who won gold medals in the springboard event of the 1988 and 1992 Olympic Games.

Diving career
Gao learned how to swim at the age of four. At nine, she started gymnastics training, before she was spotted by a diving coach and persuaded to switch to compete in diving.  She won her first major international competition - on the 3-meter springboard - in the World Championships in 1986.  Nicknamed the "Diving Queen", Gao is one of the most dominant divers in the history of the sport. Undefeated in world competition on the 3-meter springboard between 1986 and 1992 (including Olympic Games gold medals both in 1988 in Seoul and 1992 in Barcelona). She is tied with the legendary Greg Louganis in winning the greatest number of international awards on one board. She is also the only female diver to surpass the 600-points mark in the event; and she did it three times.

Gao was chosen as the World's Best Diver of the Year by the U.S. magazine Swimming World from 1987 to 1989 and the Woman's World Springboard Diver of the Year for a record seven consecutive years from 1986 to 1992.

In 1998, Gao was inducted into The International Swimming Hall of Fame.

Post-diving career
Gao coached in Edmonton, Alberta for many years for the Edmonton Kinsmen Diving club, producing many national team divers and helping to further the sport of diving in Canada.

In 2003, Gao was inducted into the Women's Sports Hall Of Fame.

In 2005, Gao left Canada to return to China to promote her autobiography. The book is currently only available in Chinese, but it will be available in English in early 2007.

Humanitarian Activism
Gao is the first ambassador of Compact2025, a partnership that develops and disseminates evidence-based advice to politicians and other decision-makers aimed at ending hunger and undernutrition in the coming 10 years.

See also
 List of members of the International Swimming Hall of Fame
 List of divers

References

External links

International swimming hall of fame
The International Women's Sports Hall of Fame

1970 births
Living people
Divers at the 1988 Summer Olympics
Divers at the 1992 Summer Olympics
Olympic gold medalists for China
People from Zigong
Olympic medalists in diving
Chinese female divers
Asian Games medalists in diving
Divers at the 1990 Asian Games
Medalists at the 1992 Summer Olympics
Medalists at the 1988 Summer Olympics
Asian Games gold medalists for China
Medalists at the 1990 Asian Games
Universiade medalists in diving
Universiade gold medalists for China
Goodwill Games medalists in diving
Medalists at the 1991 Summer Universiade
Medalists at the 1993 Summer Universiade
Competitors at the 1990 Goodwill Games